Lady Paname was a 1950 French comedy film directed and written by Henri Jeanson and starring Louis Jouvet, Suzy Delair, Henri Guisol and Henri Crémieux. It tells the story of a young female singer who tries to become a star in the music hall world of the 1920s and falls in love with a composer. It was shot at the Boulogne Studios in Paris. The film's sets were designed by the art director Jean d'Eaubonne with costumes by Georges Annenkov.

Cast
 Louis Jouvet as Gambier, dit Bagnolet - un photographe anarchiste
 Suzy Delair as Raymonde Bosset, dite Caprice - une chanteuse de music-hall
 Henri Guisol as Jeff - un compositeur de chansons
 Henri Crémieux as Milson - le directeur de l'Olympia
 Raymond Souplex as 	Arsène Marval - un chanteur célèbre et cabotin
 Jane Marken as Madame Gambier
 Claire Olivier as Léa Bosset - la mère de Caprice et de Marcel
 Camille Guérini as Auguste Bosset
 Véra Norman as La môme Oseille - l'amie de Caprice
 Monique Mélinand as Costa - l'accompagnatrice
 Germaine Montero as Mary-Flor - une chanteuse finie mais capricieuse
 Huguette Faget as Janine
 Georges Douking as Le parlementaire - un ami de Fred
 Maurice Régamey as Fred
 Odette Laure as La grue
 Odette Barencey as La dame des toilettes
 Jane Helly as 	Madame Marval - la femme du chanteur
 Maurice Nasil as Chacaton
 Albert Valsien as Le chef d'orchestre
 Sylvain as Un ami
 Jean Berton as Le régisseur
 Mag-Avril as 	L'habilleuse

References

Bibliography
 Crisp, Colin. French Cinema—A Critical Filmography: Volume 2, 1940–1958. Indiana University Press, 2015.

External links
  Official Website
   
 

1950 films
French black-and-white films
French comedy films
1950 comedy films
1950s French-language films
Films set in Paris
Films set in the 1920s
Films shot at Boulogne Studios
1950s French films